Peter Kagayi is a Ugandan poet, lawyer and teacher. He is the author of a collection of poems, The headline that morning and other poems. He has served as the Anglophone Coordinator at Writivism, and President of The Lantern Meet of Poets.

Background and education
Kagayi was born in Jinja District in Uganda, to Alimwingiza David and Namusobya Ruth. He graduated with a Bachelor of Laws from Makerere University.

He is one of the leading performance poets in Uganda. He has performed with The Lantern Meet of Poets and held a solo poetry performance, "The audience must say Amen". He is the founder and curator of a poetry platform, "The Poetry Shrine", held at the National Theatre in Kampala. His book, The headline that morning and other poems, was published in 2016.
Kagayi also writes and performs as part of Kitara Nation, a group of writers and performers based in Kampala. Ugandan poets Daniel Omara, Fahima Babirye, Hawa Nanjobe, Andrew Tuusah and Begumya Rushongoza are also part of the group.

Works

Poetry collections

Poems
"In 2065"
"Last night I told a stranger about you"

References

External links 
"Nabisunsa lives, loves poetry and creativity"
"Theatre festival soldiers on"

Living people
Ugandan writers
21st-century Ugandan poets
Ugandan male poets
People from Jinja District
People from Eastern Region, Uganda
Makerere University alumni
21st-century male writers
Year of birth missing (living people)